Édouard Lacroix (January 6, 1889 – January 19, 1963) was a politician and business person in Quebec, Canada.

Background

He was born on January 6, 1889, in Sainte-Marie, Quebec. At the age of twelve he began working in United States lumber camps along the Maine border, where he learned the logging trade. He returned to Saint-Georges, Quebec, at the age of sixteen and formed his own company in 1911. He made career in forestry and opened a lumber plant in Gaspésie–Îles-de-la-Madeleine.

Member of Parliament

Lacroix ran as a Liberal candidate in the district of Beauce in the 1925 federal election and won. He was re-elected in the 1926, 1930, 1935 and 1940 elections.

In September 1939, Lacroix and fellow Quebec Liberal MP Liguori Lacombe introduced an amendment calling for Canadian "non-participation" in the Second World War, reflecting some reluctance in French Canada to join Britain in war. The two MPs, who proved to be the amendment's only supporters, were condemned in a Globe and Mail editorial the following day as "two French-Canadians who gained eternal distinction by an attitude unworthy of their people and country."

He left the Liberals and joined the Bloc Populaire Canadien on February 18, 1943. He resigned his seat on July 11, 1944, to switch to provincial politics.

Provincial politics

Lacroix, who had been a supporter of the Action libérale nationale in the 1930s, successfully ran as a Bloc Populaire candidate in the provincial district of Beauce in the 1944 provincial election. He never took his seat at the Legislative Assembly. He resigned and left politics on May 14, 1945.

Death

He died on January 19, 1963.

References

External links
 

1889 births
1963 deaths
Bloc populaire canadien MPs
Bloc populaire MNAs
Liberal Party of Canada MPs
Members of the House of Commons of Canada from Quebec
Persons of National Historic Significance (Canada)
People from Sainte-Marie, Quebec